Gyraulus nedyalkovi is a species of small, mostly air-breathing, freshwater snail, aquatic pulmonate gastropod mollusc in the family Planorbidae, the ram's horn snails. The species is endemic to Turkey.

References

Gyraulus
Gastropods described in 2012